The dural venous sinuses (also called dural sinuses, cerebral sinuses, or cranial sinuses) are venous sinuses (channels) found between the endosteal and meningeal layers of dura mater in the brain. They receive blood from the cerebral veins, and cerebrospinal fluid (CSF) from the subarachnoid space via arachnoid granulations. They mainly empty into the internal jugular vein.

Venous sinuses

Structure
The walls of the dural venous sinuses are composed of dura mater lined with endothelium, a specialized layer of flattened cells found in blood and lymph vessels. They differ from other blood vessels in that they lack a full set of vessel layers (e.g. tunica media) characteristic of arteries and veins. It also lacks valves (in veins; with exception of materno-fetal blood circulation i.e. placental artery and pulmonary arteries both of which carry deoxygenated blood).

Clinical relevance
 
The sinuses can be injured by trauma in which damage to the dura mater, may result in blood clot formation (thrombosis) within the dural sinuses. Other common causes of dural sinus thrombosis include tracking of infection through the ophthalmic vein in orbital cellulitis. While rare, dural sinus thrombosis may lead to hemorrhagic infarction or cerebral edema with serious consequences including epilepsy, neurological deficits, or death.

Additional images

References

External links

 http://neuroangio.org/venous-brain-anatomy/venous-sinuses/
 http://rad.usuhs.edu/medpix/parent.php3?mode=TFcase_thumbnails&pt_id=13693&quiz=no#top

Veins of the head and neck